CarniK Con (Carnivorous Kinetic Concepts) was an American YouTube firearms comedy show known for its videos of firearms used in humorous scenarios and the heavy use of American symbolism. The channel debuted on Halloween 2012 and has since garnered a passionate following among gun enthusiasts across the internet. Videos typically feature Dugan Ashley and other members of CarniK Con conducting tests and evaluating firearms in unlikely, scripted scenarios. The show is typically filmed in Missouri where the group is based. CarniK Con’s video formats can range from music videos to short stories, to infomercials and 20 second shorts. The channel is also known for its firearms related meme development such as skittles and guns, SpongeBob SquarePants duct tape, Ryan Gosling and operators, and the beer company “Freedom America Ale.”

History

The channel name CarniK Con was derived by Dugan Ashley, Randy Broshankle and Stanley Childs in 2012. The name is a compression of Carnivorous Kinetic Concepts. Initially, the three considered filming episodes in traditional firearms coverage fashion, without consideration of the comedy that the channel is known for. “But we did our research and thought this was the way to take things up a notch.” They began writing and filming in November 2012. Dugan Ashley also writes the music featured in their videos along with Ted Craig who joined the group and began co-writing soon after CarniK Con’s inception.

The first video the channel released is simply titled “CarniK Con Opener.” It is the opening title sequence of the show that plays at the beginning of most episodes, ending with Randy wearing American flag patterned apparel firing a machine gun with the words excellence displayed behind him. As of September 2015, CarniK Con has gained more than 77,739 subscribers, making it the 27,977th most subscribed channel on YouTube.

Feud with FPS Russia

Upon the initial success of CarniK Con, in spring 2013 they were purportedly approached by representatives of the YouTube channel FPSRussia. During this time, FPSRussia published the video AK-47 Bacon Sundae in which an AK-47 is fired with an open receiver filled with ice cream and bacon. Fans of CarniK Con accused FPSRussia of intellectual material theft from an earlier CarniK Con video AR-15 VS AK-47, Solved Once and For All; in which Ashley fires an AK-47 with a ham sandwich in the receiver. Ashley has made no comment regarding this, but ten days following the release of AK-47 Bacon Sundae, CarniK Con released the video SUPER CARBINE COURSE, in which a character resembling Dmitri Potapoff (protagonist of FPSRussia) presumably dies while attempting to conduct a “phantom reload.” At this time, there have been no collaborations between FPSRussia and CarniK Con.

Cancellation of CarniK Con Productions

On March 27, 2015, Ashley posted a message to the official CarniK Con Facebook page stating that he was discontinuing production of new material.

″Pulling the plug on CarniK Con, effective immediately. Leaving Soc. Med. up, am available for hired work, [email removed]. May or may not upload most recent video to YT at some point, but won't be making new posts. This is probably the last one. #out″

Since the posting of this message there have been two new posts on the Facebook page unrelated to CarniK Con, but no new material has been posted nor have any plans to resume production of new videos.

On January 5, 2016, Group Coalition made a short podcast interviewing Dugan Ashley about Carnik Con.

On September 7, 2017, the CarniK Con channel was removed from YouTube. However, the content remains available on Archive.org, and several fans of the channel have created mirrors on YouTube.

On February 18, 2018, Dugan Ashley was featured as a guest on ‘InRangeTV’, a show run on YouTube collaboratively run by Karl K. Kasarda and Ian McCollum of Forgotten Weapons, another popular YouTube firearms channel. There has been no confirmation of a Carnik Con return, despite several mentions of the original channel during the video.

Merchandise
In December 2013, CarniK Con released a limited run of MIL-SPEC AR-15 Receivers featuring their logo (A creature formed by a collage of weapons known as ‘The Gun Dragon’). They were editioned from zero to 300 and sold through the firearms manufacturer Palmetto State Defense.

Resurfacing 
On December 26, 2019, Ashley created a new YouTube Channel called BoogerEater. Ashley debuted his first video the same day titled "Yankee Boogle". The video had no commentary and was a compilation of various news clips and politicians discussing gun control with the highlight of the video being about 3D printing DIAS devices (Drop In Auto Sears) and its availability in the public. Ashley has since posted various videos about politics, Covid-19, and various conspiracy theories. He has since returned from his hiatus of posting videos and livestreams discussions of those topics. As of 2022 his new YouTube Account has been removed, it is unclear if it was removed by YouTube or by Ashley himself.

Gallery

References

External links
 

Comedy-related YouTube channels
YouTube channels launched in 2012
2010s YouTube series